Agata (written: ,  or  in hiragana) is a Japanese surname. Notable people with the surname include:

, Japanese guitarist 
, Japanese singer-songwriter and actor

See also
 D'Agata
 Agate (name)

Japanese-language surnames